The Simurq PFC 2012–13 season was Simurq PFC's seventh Azerbaijan Premier League season, and it is their first full season under manager Giorgi Chikhradze. They finished the season in 4th place and were knocked out of the Azerbaijan Cup at the Quarterfinals stage by Neftchi Baku.

Squad

Transfers

Summer

In:

 

Out:

Winter

In:

 

Out:

Competitions

Friendlies

Azerbaijan Premier League

Results

League table

Azerbaijan Premier League Championship Group

Results summary

Results by round

Results

Table

Azerbaijan Cup

Squad statistics

Appearances and goals

|-
|colspan="14"|Players who appeared for Simurq no longer at the club:

|}

Goal scorers

Disciplinary record

References
Qarabağ have played their home games at the Tofiq Bahramov Stadium since 1993 due to the ongoing situation in Quzanlı.
Simurq were awarded a 3-0 victory after Ravan Baku fielded 8 foreigners during the game instead of the maximum 7.

External links 
 Official Website
 Simurq at Soccerway.com

Simurq PIK seasons
Simurq